In Field & Town is the fifth album by Canadian singer-songwriter Hayden, released January 15, 2008 on Hardwood Records and Universal Music Canada.

Track listing
 "In Field & Town" - 3:49
 "More Than Alive" - 2:59
 "The Van Song" - 2:45
 "Worthy of Your Esteem" - 3:26
 "Damn This Feeling" - 3:19
 "Did I Wake Up Beside You?" - 5:02
 "Weight of the World" - 1:41
 "Where and When" - 3:15
 "Lonely Security Guard" - 4:26
 "The Hardest Part" - 2:21
 "Barely Friends" - 3:08
 "Disappear" [iTunes Bonus Track]

Hayden (musician) albums
2008 albums